Acraspis is a genus of gall wasps in the family Cynipidae. The following species are recognised in the genus Acraspis:

 Acraspis alaria 
 Acraspis echini
 Acraspis erinacei - hedgehog gall wasp
 Acraspis gemula
 Acraspis longicornis
 Acraspis quercushirta - jewel oak gall wasp
 Acraspis pezomachoides - oak pea gall wasp
 Acraspis prinoides

References 

Cynipidae
Hymenoptera genera
Taxa named by Gustav Mayr